is a district located in Hyōgo Prefecture, Japan.

As of 2020, the district has an estimated population of 34,105. The total area is 22.61 km2.

Towns and villages
Taishi

Merger
On October 1, 2005 the towns of Ibogawa, Mitsu and Shingū merged into the expanded city of Tatsuno.

References

Districts in Hyōgo Prefecture